The 2014–15 Országos Bajnokság I (known as the E.ON férfi OB I for sponsorship reasons) is the 109th season of the Országos Bajnokság I, Hungary's premier Water polo league.

Team information

The following 14 clubs compete in the OB I during the 2014–15 season:

Regular season

Standings

Pld - Played; W - Won; D - Drawn; L - Lost; GF - Goals for; GA - Goals against; Diff - Difference; Pts - Points.

Schedule and results

Championship playoff 
Teams in bold won the playoff series. Numbers to the left of each team indicate the team's original playoff seeding. Numbers to the right indicate the score of each playoff game.

Quarterfinals

1st leg

2nd leg

Ferencvárosi TC won series 2–0 and advanced to Semifinals.

3rd leg

ZF-Eger won series 2–1 and advanced to Semifinals.

Semifinals

1st leg

2nd leg

A-HÍD OSC Újbuda won series 2–0 and advanced to the Final.

Szolnoki Dózsa-KÖZGÉP won series 2–0 and advanced to the Final.

Final
1st leg

2nd leg

3rd leg

Szolnoki Dózsa-KÖZGÉP won Championship final series 3–0.

7th – 10th placement 
Teams in bold won the playoff series. Numbers to the left of each team indicate the team's original playoff seeding. Numbers to the right indicate the score of each playoff game.

Relegation playout 
Teams in bold won the playoff series. Numbers to the left of each team indicate the team's original playoff seeding. Numbers to the right indicate the score of each playoff game.

Season statistics

Top goalscorers
Updated to games played on 19 May 2015.

Top assists
Updated to games played on 19 May 2015.

MVP
Updated to games played on 4 April 2015.

Number of teams by counties

Final standing

References

External links
 Hungarian Water Polo Federaration 

Seasons in Hungarian water polo competitions
Hungary
Orszagos Bajnoksag
Orszagos Bajnoksag
2014 in water polo
2015 in water polo